Anthony Frederick (December 7, 1964 – May 29, 2003) was an American professional basketball player. A 6'7" forward from Santa Monica College and Pepperdine University, Frederick played in three NBA seasons. He played for the Indiana Pacers, Sacramento Kings and Charlotte Hornets. In his NBA career, Frederick played in 147 games and scored a total of 718 points. He was born in Los Angeles, California. He was selected by the Denver Nuggets in the sixth round (133rd pick overall) of the 1986 NBA draft.

In addition to his time in the NBA, Frederick played four seasons in the Continental Basketball Association for the La Crosse Catbirds, Mississippi Jets, Oklahoma City Cavalry and Rapid City Thrillers.

Frederick died of an apparent heart attack on May 29, 2003, at the age of 38.

References

External links
 Basketball-Reference.com: Anthony Frederick
 
 Lega Basket Serie A Profile

1964 births
2003 deaths
American expatriate basketball people in France
American expatriate basketball people in Greece
American expatriate basketball people in Italy
American expatriate basketball people in Japan
American expatriate basketball people in Spain
American men's basketball players
Aris B.C. players
Basketball players from Los Angeles
Charlotte Hornets players
Denver Nuggets draft picks
Dinamo Sassari players
Gardena High School alumni
Greek Basket League players
Indiana Pacers players
Santa Monica Corsairs men's basketball players
La Crosse Catbirds players
Liga ACB players
Mississippi Jets players
Nagoya Diamond Dolphins players
Oklahoma City Cavalry players
Pepperdine Waves men's basketball players
Rapid City Thrillers players
Real Madrid Baloncesto players
Sacramento Kings players
Small forwards